Aniwa is a small island in the southernmost province of Tafea, Vanuatu.

As a coral island (a raised coral atoll), it rises a mere 42 m above sea level. In the northwest is Itcharo (Tiaro) lagoon, which is open to the sea.  The nearest large island is Tanna, about 24 km to the southwest.

Population
Like the nearby West Futuna, it is a Polynesian outlier, and thus its inhabitants originally came from Samoa, and the Wallis and Futuna group instead of the Melanesians of other nearby islands, although there has been much intermarriage with Tanna over the generations. The language of both islands is Futunan, in the Futunic branch of Nuclear Polynesian languages, though the dialects between the two islands are distinct. Population is about 350 in five distinct villages:
Itangutu
Imalé
Isavaï
Ikaokao
Namsafoura

The main village is Ikaokao, located in the centre of the south of the island, followed by Isavai in the islands' centre. The John Frum cargo cult exists in Ikaokao, and is unaffected by the touristic involvement that has modified the cult in Tanna.

Transportation
The island is served by Aniwa Airport, an air strip in the north with flights from Port Vila twice a week.

Anchorage is challenging in 20m on the west coast of the island, identifiable by a white square painted onto the coral face. Shipping of goods or passengers is by either the monthly interisland shipping service or the numerous small outboard motor boats operated by individuals.

A road accessible to vehicles links almost all parts of the island.

References

Islands of Vanuatu
Tafea Province
Polynesian outliers